Zaviyeh-e Sheykh Lar (also Romanized as Zāvīyeh-e Sheykh Lar) is a village in Rahal Rural District, in the Central District of Khoy County, West Azerbaijan Province, Iran. At the 2006 census, its population was 569, in 100 families.

References 

Populated places in Khoy County